Digby Wilkinson has been Dean of Saint Paul's Cathedral, Wellington since 2013. Since February 2018, he has been the Vicar of the Tawa Anglican Church in Wellington.

The New Zealand Herald published an article about his past convictions while he was the pastor of the Otumoetai Baptist Church (part of the Baptist Churches of New Zealand): 
"A Baptist pastor who is about to become Wellington's new Dean of the Anglican church comes with a chequered past, including convictions for fraud and burglary of a parishioner's house - all while he was a Bay of Plenty pastor."

Notes

1963 births
Deans of Wellington
Living people